The AN/PEQ-5 is a laser sight manufactured by Insight Technology.

The sight is mil-spec and projects a visible red dot. The unit is the Carbine Visible Laser or CVL version of the larger AN-PEQ-2, and is found in the SOPMOD Block I kit for use by the U.S. military. The unit comprises a single rugged box that houses a visible red laser, which mounts to a weapon using a MIL-STD-1913 rail. The one major difference between the AN-PEQ-5 and the larger AN-PEQ-2, is the AN-PEQ-5 lacks the IR illuminator/target designator which is only visible through night vision devices. This feature is primarily used to aid with aiming while using night vision. Both are products of Insight Technologies.

See also
AN/PEQ-2
AN/PEQ-6

References

Firearm sights
Military electronics of the United States
Laser aiming modules